Menora Mivtachim Arena (also known as the Yad Eliyahu Arena, ; and formerly known as the Nokia Arena) is a large multi-purpose sports indoor arena that is located in southeast Tel Aviv, Israel. The arena is primarily used to host tennis matches, basketball games, and concerts.

It is one of the major sporting facilities in the Greater Tel Aviv Area. The arena is owned by the municipality of Tel Aviv, and is managed by Sports Palaces Ltd., a company also fully owned by the municipality (which also manages Bloomfield Stadium and Drive in Arena). On 1 January 2015, the arena changed its name to Menora Mivtachim Arena.

History
The arena was opened on 17 September 1963, with a game between the national basketball teams of Israel and Yugoslavia, in which the latter won, by a score of 69–64. In its early years, the arena held a capacity of 5,000 spectators, with just concrete stands, without any seats, and without a roof. 

In 1972, a second floor of tiers was built, increasing the capacity to 10,000 spectators. The concrete stands were covered by seats, and the arena was covered with a roof. Further renovations through the years 2005–2007 modernized the arena further, added commercial facilities, and increased its capacity to 10,383 with permanent seating, 10,823 for basketball games, and 5,941 for concerts.

Events

Sport
The arena is home to the Maccabi Tel Aviv basketball club, a member of the Maccabi Tel Aviv sports club. It has hosted the Israeli Super League final four, the Israeli State Cup final four, and most of the senior Israeli national basketball team's home games.

It hosted the FIBA EuroStars all-star game in 1997, the FIBA European Champions Cup (now called EuroLeague) Finals game of the 1971–72 season, and the EuroLeague Final Four in 1994 and 2004. The arena was also used to host one of the group stages of EuroBasket 2017, and the 2020–21 FIBA Europe Cup Final Four.

In other sports, it has also hosted a 1989 Davis Cup World Group match, between Israel and France, and the 2009 Davis Cup quarterfinals between Israel and Russia, in July 2009.

It will host preliminary matches for the 2023 FIBA Women's EuroBasket.

Entertainment
The arena has hosted various musical acts, such as: Teen Angels, Lali, Scorpions, Paul Anka, Take That, Rod Stewart, Neil Sedaka, Cyndi Lauper, LMFAO, Westlife, Five, Philipp Kirkorov, Juan Luis Guerra, Natalia Oreiro, Alicia Keys, Charles Aznavour, Sean Paul, and Julio and Enrique Iglesias.
 
The Mamma Mia! international tour played 24 shows at the venue as well. The arena also hosted shows of the international tour Alegría, of Cirque du Soleil. On 19 and 20 December 2015 the arena hosted comedian Jerry Seinfeld, in his first live performance in Israel. All four shows of the comedian were sold out.

Gallery

See also
 List of indoor arenas in Israel
 Basketball in Israel

References

External links

 Menora Mivtachim Arena the official website

Maccabi Tel Aviv B.C.
Basketball venues in Israel
Indoor arenas in Israel
Sports venues completed in 1963
Sports venues in Tel Aviv
Tennis venues in Israel